Random Access Memories is the fourth and final studio album by the French electronic duo Daft Punk, released on 17 May 2013 through Columbia Records. The album pays tribute to late 1970s and early 1980s American music, particularly from Los Angeles. This theme is reflected in the album's packaging, as well as its promotional campaign, which included billboards, television advertisements, and a web series. Recording sessions took place from 2008 to 2012 at Henson, Conway and Capitol Studios in California, Electric Lady Studios in New York City, and Gang Recording Studio in Paris, France.

Following the minimal production of their previous studio album, Human After All (2005), Daft Punk recruited session musicians to perform live instrumentation and limited the use of electronic instruments to drum machines, a custom-built modular synthesizer, and vintage vocoders. The album has been noted by music critics as a disco album, while drawing influence from progressive rock and pop. The album features collaborations with Giorgio Moroder, Panda Bear, Julian Casablancas, Todd Edwards, DJ Falcon, Chilly Gonzales, Nile Rodgers, Paul Williams, Nathan East, and Pharrell Williams. It is Daft Punk's only album released through Columbia Records.

Random Access Memories became Daft Punk's first and only album to top the US Billboard 200, and has since been certified platinum by the Recording Industry Association of America (RIAA). It also topped the charts in twenty other countries. Its lead single "Get Lucky" was a critical and commercial worldwide success, topping the charts in over thirty countries and becoming one of the best-selling digital singles of all time. The album received critical acclaim, appearing on several year-end lists, and won in several categories at the 2014 Grammy Awards, including Album of the Year, Best Dance/Electronica Album, and Best Engineered Album, Non-Classical. "Get Lucky" also won the awards for Record of the Year and Best Pop Duo/Group Performance. In 2020, Rolling Stone ranked the album at number 295 on their list of the "500 Greatest Albums of All Time".

Background 
In 2008, after finishing their Alive 2006/2007 tour, Daft Punk began working on new material in Paris, recording demos for approximately six months. They were pleased with the compositions, but dissatisfied with their process of sampling and looping, as they had done for their previous albums. As Thomas Bangalter of Daft Punk stated, "We could play some riffs and stuff but not keep it [up] for four minutes straight." Daft Punk put these demos aside and started work on the Tron: Legacy film soundtrack, which Bangalter described as "very humbling". For their next album, Daft Punk decided to work extensively with live musicians; according to Bangalter, "We wanted to do what we used to do with machines and samplers, but with people." They avoided the use of samples, with the exception of the closing track "Contact".

The album features Chic frontman Nile Rodgers. According to Rodgers, the collaboration was "something we've talked about for a long time. We've respected each other endlessly." Daft Punk visited Rodgers' home for an informal jam session. Musician Paul Williams announced in a 2010 interview that he had worked with the group, after Daft Punk had been introduced to Williams by a sound engineer with whom they were mutually acquainted.

In May 2012, Daft Punk's collaboration with Giorgio Moroder was announced. Moroder had recorded a monologue about his life for use in a track on the album. Rodgers was also present during the Moroder recording session. Moroder clarified that he was not involved in the composition of the track or its use of a synthesizer: "They did not let me get involved at all. Thomas asked me if I wanted to tell the story of my life. Then they would know what to do with it." Daft Punk had been in contact with Moroder in relation to a possible contribution for the Tron: Legacy score, but this never happened.

Chilly Gonzales stated in an interview that his contribution was recorded in a one-day session: "I played for hours and they're gonna grab what they grab and turn it into whatever." He explained that Daft Punk prompted him at the piano in the same manner that a film director coaches an actor, and Gonzales left the Los Angeles studio without knowledge of what the final product would sound like. He had previously recorded a cover version of Daft Punk's song "Too Long" that appeared on the duo's 2003 album Daft Club.

Pharrell Williams collaborated with Daft Punk and Rodgers by providing vocals for two tracks on Random Access Memories. As a member of the Neptunes, Pharrell had previously provided a remix of "Harder, Better, Faster, Stronger" that appeared on Daft Club. The Neptunes and Daft Punk also co-produced N.E.R.D.'s song "Hypnotize U".

Recording 

Daft Punk recorded Random Access Memories in secrecy. Recording took place at Henson Recording Studios, Conway Recording Studios and Capitol Studios in California, Electric Lady Studios in New York City, and Gang Recording Studio in Paris. Having worked with keyboardist and arranger Chris Caswell on Tron: Legacy, Daft Punk enlisted him and connected with engineers and other session players. They wanted to avoid the more compressed sounds of drum machines in favor of "airy open" drum sets of the 1970s and 80s, which they considered the most appealing era of music. They said the session players were enthusiastic about reuniting in the context of the new album and the prestige of the studio locations.

Drummer Omar Hakim recalled being asked by Daft Punk to perform on the album, and was surprised by what they wanted of him. He at first assumed that the duo wanted electronic drum work, since Hakim had done some drum programming in his career. Daft Punk instead specified that they were looking to record Hakim performing acoustic drum riffs that the duo had conceived. Rather than play out the entire structure of a song, Hakim would perform individual patterns for extended periods, creating a library for the duo to cull from. Daft Punk conveyed their ideas to session musicians via sheet music and in some instances by humming melodies. For example, Bangalter hummed a complex drum and bass line to Hakim, who replicated and improved upon it for the track "Giorgio by Moroder".

Most of the vocal sessions took place in Paris, whereas the rhythm sections were recorded in the United States. The album incorporates a variety of accompanying performances including a horn section, woodwind instruments, a string orchestra and choir. Orchestral parts were recorded for almost every track, but used for only a few on the completed album. The use of such performers and places came at great monetary expense, as noted by Bangalter: "There used to be a time where people that had means to experiment would do it, you know? That's what this record is about." He estimated a cost of over one million dollars, but felt that the number was not important. Bangalter stated that the sessions were financed by Daft Punk themselves, which allowed them the luxury of abandoning the project if they had so wished. He also specified that "there are songs on the album that traveled into five studios over two and a half years."

Various sound effects were newly recorded with the help of film experts from Warner Bros. Bangalter noted one example in which the sound of a busy restaurant was achieved by placing microphones in front of the forks of a group of people. In another instance, the effect of dripping water was recorded on a soundstage. Use of electronics was limited to drum machines that appear on only two tracks, a large custom-built Modcan modular synthesizer performed live by the duo, and vintage vocoders. When asked which of the two Daft Punk members performed the robotic vocals on the album, Bangalter expressed that it did not matter. The duo produced most of the vocoder tracks in their own private studio in Paris, with later processing done by Mick Guzauski at Capitol. Moroder elaborated that Daft Punk would take "a week or so" to find an adequate vocoder sound, and an additional few days to record the lyrics.

Although the duo felt that the presets and parameters of digital tools would inhibit creativity and innovation, they admitted that Random Access Memories could not have been made in the complete absence of computer technology. The sessions were recorded simultaneously onto Ampex reels and as Pro Tools tracks; Daft Punk and Guzauski would then listen to each recording in both analogue and digital iterations, deciding which of the two they preferred. Subsequently, the elements were edited by the duo with Pro Tools in a manner similar to how they would work with samples.

In an interview conducted in November 2012 by Guitar World magazine, Fourplay member Nathan East mentioned that he had contributed to the project. The percussionist Quinn also stated that he performed on "every drum [he] own[s]" for the album. Pedal steel guitar work on the record was performed by Greg Leisz. Daft Punk sought to use the instrument in a way that bordered between electronic and acoustic. Additional session players include John "J.R." Robinson, Paul Jackson, Jr., James Genus and Thomas Bloch.

Music

Theme and influences 
Bangalter described the album's title as encapsulating Daft Punk's interest in the past, referencing both random-access memory technology and the human experience: "We were drawing a parallel between the brain and the hard drive – the random way that memories are stored." Daft Punk felt that while current technology allows for an unlimited capacity to store recorded material, the content produced by contemporary artists had diminished in quality. Their goal was therefore to maximize the potential of infinite storage by recording a sprawling amount of elements. The duo pointed to the process as being further inspiration for the album's title, as they sought to make connections out of the random series of ideas.

Random Access Memories has been noted by music critics as a disco album. Regarding the style of the album, they sought a "west coast vibe", referencing such acts as Fleetwood Mac, the Doobie Brothers, and the Eagles. Daft Punk also acknowledged that the record pays homage to Michael Jackson, the Cars, and Steely Dan. The recording of live synthesizer parts was done in a progressive rock fashion, with the pop sensibilities of Wizzard and the Move. Daft Punk specifically looked to the albums Rumours by Fleetwood Mac and The Dark Side of the Moon by Pink Floyd as models. Bangalter remarked upon several records of the album era, saying that "the most important records in music, whether it's Led Zeppelin [...] or The White Album or Sgt. Pepper's... or Quadrophenia or Tommy, are the ones that take you on a journey for miles and miles."

Composition 

The initial demos of Random Access Memories were created without a clear plan for an album. Over the course of the sessions, numerous tracks were created and discarded. At one point Daft Punk had considered sorting the entire album into one continuous track, similar to the Prince record Lovesexy.  They had also considered releasing it as a four-disc box set to accommodate the large volume of content produced. Thus the album lacked structure until the final months of production.

The opening track, "Give Life Back to Music", features guitar work by Rodgers and Paul Jackson, Jr., drums by John "J.R." Robinson, and lyrics performed by Daft Punk using vocoders. The song reflects the duo's goal to create a light yet polished and elegant record. As stated by NME, the album begins with "a stupendously vast rock intro that obliterates any trace of Human After All's brittle techno". The following track, "The Game of Love", also features vocoder singing by the duo. Bangalter said, "There's this thing today where the recorded human voice is processed to try to feel robotic." He explained that the duo's intention was to produce robotic vocals with expressiveness and emotion. "Giorgio by Moroder" was created to serve as a metaphor about musical freedom. The duo believed that a monologue by Moroder about his career would be an analogue for music's history regarding exploration of genres and tastes. In the monologue, Moroder details the creative process behind Donna Summer's I Remember Yesterday (1977) and its closing track "I Feel Love".

"Within" was one of the first tracks to be recorded for the album. It features Gonzales on piano with minimal accompaniment consisting of bass and a percussion track, as well as vocoder. In the context of the album, "Within" marks the transition from the key of A minor of the previous three songs, to the key of B-flat minor of subsequent tracks. Regarding the lyrics, critic Nick Stevenson observed, "A deep vocoder sings about not understanding the world, being lost and not even remembering his own name." Jeremy Abbott of Mixmag added, "So many things I don't understand is the prominent lyric and Chilly's chords combined with grazing cymbals make for a beautiful summer lullaby."

"Instant Crush" was based on a demo that Daft Punk presented to Julian Casablancas; he became enthused upon hearing it and provided vocals. The song contains rock influences and a guitar solo. Critic John Balfe considered it "appropriately Strokes-ish, even if [Casablancas'] trademark drawl is fed quite substantially through a vocoder." De Homem-Christo noted, "It is true that it is not his usual register, it is the way Julian reacted to the track so for us it is even more exciting." "Lose Yourself to Dance" features Pharrell Williams and was the result of a desire to create dance music with live drummers. To that end, Robinson appears as session player. A vocoder chant of "come on" appears in the song alongside Pharrell Williams's singing.

"Touch" features lyrics written and performed by Paul Williams. Daft Punk noted that the song is the most complex piece on the record, being composed of over 250 elements. As Pitchfork observed, "the song warps and bends, floating through genres, epochs, and emotions with a sense of hallucinatory wonder" and recalls the Beatles song "A Day in the Life". In Rolling Stone, Will Hermes observes, "It's completely ridiculous. It's also remarkably beautiful and affecting." Louis Lepron of Kombini believed the multitude of styles and science fiction aesthetics on the track is an homage to musical films including Phantom of the Paradise, the soundtrack of which Williams had composed. The song's opening is a specific reference to a scene in the film in which the title character's voice is gradually enhanced in a studio booth. De Homem-Christo stated that "Touch" is "like the core of the record, and the memories of the other tracks are revolving around it."

"Get Lucky" is the second song on the album to feature Pharrell Williams, who clarified that the title phrase does not simply refer to a sexual act, but to the potential fortune of finding chemistry with another person. When he had first heard the song, Pharrell Williams said it evoked the image of a "peachy color[ed]" sunrise on an exotic island. Daft Punk discussed the concept of the song "Beyond" with Paul Williams, who then translated the ideas into lyrics for it. The track begins with an orchestral string section and timpani before settling into what NME called "reupholstered Warren G 'Regulate' grooves". Stevenson similarly described "Beyond" as "a lot like the sample used in Nate Dogg and Warren G's ‘Regulate’", Michael McDonald's song "I Keep Forgettin'", which he noted as "no bad thing", and stated that the vocoder-affected lyrics detail "the existential world beyond oceans and mountains – a land beyond love."

"Motherboard" was described by Daft Punk as being "a futuristic composition that could be from the year 4000". A review elaborated that the instrumental piece can "carry you away like a track by Sébastien Tellier". Todd Edwards commented that the lyrics of "Fragments of Time" were inspired by his desire to capture the moments he experienced during his visit to the duo's studio sessions in California. "Doin' It Right" was the last song to be recorded and features vocals performed by Panda Bear. The duo referred to it as the only purely electronic piece on the album, with a modern style. The closing track, "Contact", is co-produced by DJ Falcon and features a sample of the song "We Ride Tonight" by Australian rock band the Sherbs.

The Japan-exclusive bonus track "Horizon", written by Bangalter and de Homem Christo, is a slow-tempo composition reminiscent of Pink Floyd. It is characterized by a consistent guitar strum while several additional instruments are progressively layered over, including a bass guitar and drums. The song is stylistically different from other tracks on the album, and is one of the few to feature no lyrics.

Promotion and release 

In January 2013, de Homem-Christo first revealed that Daft Punk was in the process of signing with Sony Music Entertainment through the Columbia Records label, and that the album would have a spring release. A report from The Guardian followed specifying a release date of May 2013. On 26 February 2013, Daft Punk's official website and Facebook page announced the signing to Columbia with a picture of the duo's helmets, and a "Columbia" logo in the corner. Billboards and posters featuring the helmets and logo then appeared in several major cities.

On 2 March, a 15-second television ad aired during Saturday Night Live (SNL) depicting an animated, stylized version of the band's logo and the aforementioned image of the helmets. The music featured in the ad was a result of the collaboration with Rodgers, who noted that various fan remixes of the clip appeared online after the airing. A second TV ad also premiered that was similar to the first on Saturday Night Live, but with a different music clip and the title Random Access Memories in place of the stylized Daft Punk logo. During the first night of Coachella Festival 2013, a third trailer debuted that featured Daft Punk, Pharrell Williams and Rodgers performing, as well as a list of collaborators on the album. The trailer also aired during Saturday Night Live the following evening, but without a list of collaborators.

The gradual rollout of promotion was inspired by advertising of the past, reflecting the theme of the album. Daft Punk approached Columbia with a specific agenda for the campaign; Rob Stringer of the label recalled that the duo had showed him the book Rock 'n' Roll Billboards of the Sunset Strip as an example of what they wanted. Bangalter felt that physical billboards are more affecting than banner ads and that "SNL is this part of American culture with a certain timelessness to it." The campaign was handled by a small group led by Daft Punk and manager Paul Hahn, with assistance from Kathryn Frazier of the public-relations firm Biz 3. The duo had pursued Columbia in particular because of its long-standing history, as expressed by Bangalter: "It felt interesting conceptually to write this story with a record company like Columbia, with a 125-year legacy."

Central to the promotion was the limiting of exposure to the album's content, as well as a focus on face-to-face contact for press previews. As Hahn stated, "There is a minimalism in our approach that creates an absence of information, and we notice our fans tend to throw themselves into the breach, or try to fill the empty spaces." Following a reported leak of the song days earlier, "Get Lucky" was released as a digital download single on 19 April 2013. On 13 May, a limited-time preview stream of the full album was launched via the iTunes Store.

Daft Punk were scheduled to appear on 6 August episode of The Colbert Report to promote Random Access Memories, but were unable to do so because of conflicting obligations regarding the duo's future appearance at the 2013 MTV Video Music Awards. According to Stephen Colbert, Daft Punk were unaware of any exclusivity agreement and were halted by MTV executives the morning prior to the taping. Colbert nevertheless broadcast an elaborate sketch of himself dancing to "Get Lucky" with various celebrities, including Hugh Laurie, Jeff Bridges, Jimmy Fallon, Bryan Cranston, Jon Stewart, Henry Kissinger, Matt Damon, and the Rockettes.

Artwork packaging
Unlike the previous studio albums that feature the band's wordmark as the cover art, Random Access Memories is the first and only one to not do so. Instead, it features the band members' signature helmets with the album title written on the top left. The font is reminiscent to that of Michael Jackson's Thriller. The image of the helmets was first revealed on Daft Punk's website, and became a recurring symbol throughout the promotional campaign.

The album's track titles were initially withheld from online retailers and later revealed through Columbia's Vine account on 16 April 2013, as a video relaying a series of images from the back cover of the record. On 13 May, Daft Punk's official Vevo channel posted a video revealing the artwork packaging of the vinyl version of the album, as well as the first few seconds of the opening track. Disc labels of the album feature the classic yellow and red Columbia design used on records during the 1970s and '80s, reflecting the album's theme.

Columbia released a deluxe box set of Random Access Memories containing a 56-page hardcover book, the vinyl edition of the album, a partial 70 mm film strip of the "Lose Yourself to Dance" video, and triangle-designed gold and silver plated USB drives, which contain standard and bonus audio as well as video content, respectively.

The Collaborators 

A video series called The Collaborators, directed by Ed Lachman and produced by The Creators Project, a partnership between Intel and Vice, was featured on Daft Punk's Random Access Memories website. Eight episodes were released in the series, which features interviews with participant artists that were involved in the making of the album. The episodes were released weekly leading up to the album's launch. All featured album artists appear in the series with the exception of Casablancas, who would go on to appear prominently in the music video for "Instant Crush". Excerpts of the lead single "Get Lucky" appear in the opening and ending of each Collaborators episode as well as excerpts of other songs from the album, corresponding to each featured musician.

The first episode features disco pioneer Moroder speaking about his experiences with the genre such as his records with Donna Summer and experimenting with synthesizers. Moroder also talks about his visit with Daft Punk in their recording studio. When asked how he first found out about the duo, he replied that he first heard their 2000 single "One More Time" and especially liked the breakdown middle section. He concluded that he views Daft Punk as "perfectionists" and described the album's style as "something [...] different. Still dance, still electronic; but [they] give that human touch back".

Episode two revealed that Edwards had contributed to the album; he expressed that it was difficult keeping his involvement a secret. Edwards had previously collaborated with Daft Punk to create the song "Face to Face" on the 2001 album Discovery. He summarized his experience in the studio recording "Fragments of Time" as being life-changing, as the sessions inspired him to move from New Jersey to California on a permanent basis. Edwards also pointed out the irony of "two androids [...] bringing soul back to music".

The third episode features Rodgers, who spoke of his background as a founding member of Chic, as well as his numerous collaborations with other artists throughout his career, such as David Bowie, Madonna, and Duran Duran. He expressed that working with Daft Punk "[felt] like [...] working with contemporaries" and that they motivated each other to excel when collaborating on the album. At the end of the episode, Rodgers played a portion of a then-unspecified song in which he participated, which was later identified as "Lose Yourself to Dance", and remarked that the duo's style has evolved whilst simultaneously exploring music's past, suggesting that "they went back to go forward."

Pharrell Williams participated in the fourth episode in which he elaborated on his experience with the creation of the album. Pharrell remarked upon the organic sound of the album, surmising that it "feels like the only click track they had was [...] the human heartbeat". He felt that the record can be enjoyed by people of all ages due to the accessible nature of music, and concluded that Daft Punk "could just get back on the spaceship that brought them here and go, and leave us. But they're gracious, they're nice robots. They chose to stay".

Episode five features Noah Lennox, better known by his stage name Panda Bear, who spoke about his contribution to the album as well as his history with the band Animal Collective. He had first heard of Daft Punk through the music video of the song "Around the World", which introduced him to many aspects of electronic dance music. He added that Homework was one of the few albums he and his older brother both enjoyed. Regarding Random Access Memories, Lennox remarked upon the approach of having live musicians, but structuring their performances in a minimal, sample-like fashion.

For the sixth episode, Gonzales spoke about his contribution to the album. He recalled Daft Punk's visible joy in listening to the raw session recordings made early in the production of the album, as well as the impending years-long challenge that would be faced in completing the record. Gonzales expressed that the duo were aware of how the keys of each song would contribute to the emotional progression of the album as a whole. He therefore performed the piano in the song "Within" to accommodate the cycle. Gonzales concluded by pointing out that Daft Punk rarely collaborate with others, and thus felt that they did so on Random Access Memories to "make the work be transcendent".

The seventh episode features Stéphane Quême, otherwise known as DJ Falcon, who spoke of first meeting Daft Punk when they began recording their debut album Homework. Quême noted that their sound had since changed and that each of their albums drew from different influences. He felt producers would be able to sample Random Access Memories in the same way Daft Punk had sampled older records in their previous albums.

Episode eight features Paul Williams, who likened Daft Punk's personas to a character from the film Phantom of the Paradise, in which he starred. He also added that their masks hide who they are from the public and allow the listeners to enjoy the music for what it is. Paul Williams worked with the duo at Henson Recording Studios, the former studio of A&M Records where he had worked previously, including his compositions for Jim Henson's films featuring the Muppets, such as "Rainbow Connection". He also stated that the song he penned was to be sung from the point of view of an unidentified first person, setting the emotion, but the lyrics came from the music itself. Paul Williams said that he felt vulnerable while writing the record, and said he writes best when he is allowed to be honest and vulnerable, a situation that Daft Punk nurtured. He also stated that his sobriety added a sense of wonder to the song he wrote, as every day for him being sober has been wonderful compared to his prior life of excess.

Global album launch 
The 79th Annual Wee Waa Show, held on 17 May 2013 in the rural Australian town of Wee Waa, was selected as the venue for the worldwide album launch. The tickets for the Wee Waa album launch were completely sold within thirteen minutes of release, even though it was widely understood that Daft Punk would not be in attendance at the launch—the album launch details revealed that the album would be streamed live to the 4,000 audience members. Australian police in the local Wee Waa area initiated Operation Hadrian to prevent alcohol-related problems and anti-social behaviour at the launch event.

Sony commissioned the design and construction of a custom-built stage for the Wee Waa album launch event, and the Daft Arts production house assembled a LED circular music space that became Australia's biggest-ever outdoor dance floor. The record label described the creation, which was illuminated by a giant disco ball and complemented by four speaker towers and flood lights, as "Saturday Night Fever meets Close Encounters of the Third Kind". The prelude to the streaming of the album was a pyrotechnic show provided by Father Anthony Koppman and his company "Holy Smoke" from Guyra, New South Wales.

Critical reception 

Random Access Memories received widespread acclaim from critics. At Metacritic, which assigns a weighted mean rating out of 100 to reviews from mainstream critics, the album gained an average score of 87, based on 47 reviews. The album scored higher than any other album by the duo.

Q referred to it as "by some margin Daft Punk's best album in a career that's already redefined dance music at least twice. It is, in short, a mind blower." The Independent stated, "Random Access Memories breathes life into the safe music that dominates today's charts, with its sheer ambition ... It's an exciting journey, and one that, for all its musical twists and turns, has its feet planted on the dancefloor." Melissa Maerz of Entertainment Weekly called it "a headphones album in an age of radio singles; a bravura live performance that stands out against pro forma knob-twiddling; a jazzy disco attack on the basic house beat; a full collaboration at a time when the superstar DJ stands alone." She concluded her review by saying that "if EDM is turning humans into robots, Daft Punk are working hard to make robot pop feel human again."

Several critics commented on the variety of content on the album. NME said, "There's a creeping notion that every musical idea that's ever been so much as thought up is on this album." In addition, Random Access Memories is ranked No. 497 on NME'''s list, "The 500 Greatest Albums Of All Time". Mark Richardson of Pitchfork echoed this sentiment, calling the record "a mix of disco, soft rock, and prog-pop, along with some Broadway-style pop bombast and even a few pinches of their squelching stadium-dance aesthetic". Richardson praised the engineering and recording on the album, but did say that "though everything about RAM, from the session musicians to the guests to the means of production, is meant to sound more 'human,' the album at points sounds more sterile, almost too perfect." Pitchfork named the album the seventh-best of 2013.DJ Magazine commented on the shift in Daft Punk's musical style: "While Daft Punk clearly want to move on and evolve, ditching the electronic beats, house and techno that first elevated them to fame, it's that music that forms the bedrock of their best tunes, and still, that's what they're best at making." Resident Advisor stated that "it's an album rooted in a now-ancient aesthetic: '70s staples, like crisply recorded California studio music, or the kind of deceptively sophisticated New York disco that , one of the album's key guest artists, popularized with Chic." In a five-star review, Heather Phares of AllMusic said that the record "taps into the wonder and excitement" of music from the 1970s and early 1980s. Phares concluded her review by saying, "Random Access Memories is also Daft Punk's most personal work, and richly rewarding for listeners willing to spend time with it."

Aaron Payne of musicOMH wrote, "Daft Punk somehow misplace the wit and the light touch that's pretty much their trademark. Instead, these long epics become somewhat tedious and there is a strong whiff of egoism and self-indulgence ... At over 70 minutes, the album feels rather bloated. Quite a few of the songs are too long, or too empty of ideas, or too willing to repeat themselves, or too willing to play to type". Dan Weiss of Paste noted that "none of the admittedly eclectic pilferings of Random Access Memories challenge or defy anything. They all evoke specific eras of film soundtrack or disco trend. The beats have grown less, not more, complex over time." In 2021, Pitchfork included Random Access Memories on its list of review scores they "would change if they could", adjusting its score from 8.8 out of 10 to 6.8. The Pitchfork critic Philip Sherburne wrote that it "doesn't feel pivotal in the same way that Discovery did" and "didn't push pop music forward".Random Access Memories received Grammy Awards for Album of the Year, Best Dance/Electronica Album and Best Engineered Album, Non-Classical for the 56th Annual Grammy Awards. The lead single, "Get Lucky", also won for Record of the Year and Best Pop Duo/Group Performance. "Get Lucky" had previously been nominated for Best Song of the Summer at the 2013 MTV Video Music Awards and Best Song at the 2013 MTV Europe Music Awards. In January 2015, the album was placed at number 9 on Billboards list of "The 20 Best Albums of 2010s (so far)". In 2020, the album was ranked at 65 on the 100 Best Albums of the 21st Century list of Stacker.

 Commercial performance 
Random Access Memories debuted at number one on the French Albums Chart with first-week sales of 195,013 copies (127,361 physical sales and 67,652 digital sales), earning Daft Punk their first number-one album in France. The next week, it sold 49,600 copies to remain at the top spot with a 75% sales decrease. The album secured a third consecutive week atop the French chart, withstanding a 29% sales drop to 35,500 copies.

Random Access Memories debuted at number one on the UK Albums Chart with 165,091 copies sold in its first week, becoming the duo's first UK number-one album, as well as the second fastest-selling artist album of 2013 after One Direction's Midnight Memories.  The album remained at number one on the UK chart the following week, selling 52,801 copies. In its third week, it fell to number three on sales of 28,182 copies.

In the United States, the album debuted at number one on the Billboard 200 with first-week sales of 339,000 copies, the duo's first number one album on the chart. The album maintained the number one spot in its second week, selling 93,000 copies. In the album's third week of release, it sold an additional 62,000 copies, while falling to number two on the Billboard 200. The album's vinyl LP format also proved popular; it was 2013's top-selling LP, with 49,000 US copies shifted. The album had sold 922,000 copies in the US as of January 2014. On 6 February 2014, the album was certified platinum by the Recording Industry Association of America (RIAA). Following the duo's Album of the Year win at the 56th Annual Grammy Awards, Random Access Memories jumped from number 39 to number 10 on the Billboard 200 with a 300% sales increase, selling 30,000 copies that week.

Random Access Memories entered the Canadian Albums Chart at number one with 46,000 copies sold, the biggest one-week sales total in Canada of 2013. The album remained at number one the next week, selling 17,000 copies. In Japan, the album debuted at number three on the Oricon Weekly Albums Chart, selling 25,970 copies.

The album debuted at number one in several countries across continental Europe, including Austria, Belgium, Czech Republic, Denmark (where the album sold 5,392 copies in its first week), Finland, Germany, Ireland, Italy, Norway, Portugal, Spain and Switzerland. In Oceania, Random Access Memories debuted at number one in Australia and New Zealand; it was certified platinum by the Australian Recording Industry Association (ARIA) and gold by the Recording Industry Association of New Zealand (RIANZ) in its first week.

As of 2014, Random Access Memories has sold 3.2 million copies worldwide.

 Track listing Sample credits' "Contact" contains a sample from "We Ride Tonight", as performed by the Sherbs, and an excerpt from the Apollo 17 mission, performed by Eugene Cernan, courtesy of NASA.

 Personnel 
Adapted from the liner notes.

 Featured artists 

 Daft Punk – vocals (tracks 1, 2, 4, 6–9, 12), modular synthesizer (tracks 1, 3, 7, 10, 12, 13), synthesizer (tracks 2, 5, 8, 9, 14), keyboards (tracks 3, 4, 5, 11), guitar (track 5), production, concept, art direction
 Panda Bear – vocals (track 12)
 Julian Casablancas – vocals, lead guitar and co-production (track 5)
 Todd Edwards – vocals and co-production (track 11)
 DJ Falcon – modular synthesizer and co-production (track 13)
 Chilly Gonzales – keyboards (track 1), piano (track 4)
 Giorgio Moroder – voice (track 3)
 Nile Rodgers – guitar (tracks 1, 6, 8)
 Paul Williams – vocals and lyrics (track 7), lyrics (track 9)
 Pharrell Williams – vocals (tracks 6, 8)

 Additional musicians 

 Greg Leisz – pedal steel guitar (tracks 1–3, 9, 10, 14), lap steel guitar (tracks 7, 9)
 Chris Caswell – keyboards (tracks 1–4, 7–11, 14), orchestration, arrangements
 Paul Jackson, Jr. – guitar (tracks 1–3, 7–11, 14)
 Nathan East – bass (tracks 1–6, 8, 11, 14)
 James Genus – bass (tracks 3, 7, 9–11, 13)
 John "J.R." Robinson – drums (tracks 1,2, 4–6, 14)
 Omar Hakim – drums (tracks 3, 7–9, 11, 13), percussion (track 10)
 Quinn – percussion (tracks 1, 3–5, 7, 10, 11), drums (track 7)
 Thomas Bloch – ondes Martenot (track 7), cristal baschet (track 10)
 Assa Dori, Johana Krejci, Rita Weber, Kevin Connolly, Joel Pargman, Song Lee, Irina Voloshina, Margaret Wooten, Mary K. Sloan, Nina Evtuhov, Miwako Watanabe, Samuel Fischer, Lisa Dondinger, Rafael Rishik, Cynthia Moussas, Sara Perkins, Neel Hammond, Olivia Tsui, Calabria McChesney, Carrie Kennedy, Lisa Sutton, Audrey Solomon – violin (tracks 3, 7, 9, 10)
 Andrew Picken, Alma Fernandez, Rodney Wirtz, Carolyn Riley, Harry Shirinan, Jody Rubin, Roland Kato, Ray Tischer – viola (tracks 3, 7, 9, 10)
 Christina Soulw, Paula Hochalter, Vanessa F. Smith, Timothy Loo, Armen Ksajikian – cello (tracks 3, 7, 9, 10)
 Charles Berghofer, Don Ferrone, Drew Dembowski – double bass (tracks 3, 7, 9, 10)
 Greg Huckins, Steve Kajala, Sara Andon – flute (tracks 3, 7, 9, 10)
 Earl Dumler – oboe (tracks 3, 7, 9, 10)
 Marty Krystall, Gene Cipriano – clarinet (tracks 3, 7, 9, 10)
 Gene Cipriano – bass clarinet (tracks 3, 7, 9, 10)
 Judith Farmer – bassoon (tracks 3, 7, 9, 10)
 Davis Kosoff – horn (tracks 3, 7, 9, 10)
 Nathan Campbell, James Atkinson, Justin Hageman, Stephanie O’Keefe, Danielle Ondarza – french horn (tracks 3, 7, 9, 10)
 Gary Grant, Warren Luening, Charles Findley, Larry McGuire – trumpet (tracks 3, 7, 9, 10)
 Andrew Martin, Charles Morillas, Charles Looper, Bob McChesny – trombone (tracks 3, 7, 9, 10)
 Craig Gosnell – bass trombone (tracks 3, 7, 9, 10)
 Brian Kilmore, Mark Converse – percussions (tracks 3, 7, 9, 10)
 Shirley Koesnadi, Alissa M. Cremshaw, Elaina S. Crenshaw, Alexandra Gunn, Jeffery Gunn, Emma S. Gunn, Victor Pineshi, Mariah A. Britt, Joshua Britt, Alycia Grant, Chelsea T. DiBlasi, Jessica Rotter – choir vocals (track 7)

 Production 

 Bob Ludwig – mastering
 Chab (Antoine Chabert) – mastering
 Paul Hahn – management
 Cédric Hervet – creative director, cover art
 Warren Fu – cover art, illustrations
 Mick Guzauski – recording, mixing engineer
 Peter Franco – recording engineer
 Florian Lagatta – recording engineer
 Daniel Lerner – digital audio engineer

 Charts 

 Weekly charts 

 Year-end charts 

Decade-end charts

 Certifications and sales 

 Release history 
On 23 March, the album became available for pre-order on the iTunes Store via digital download, revealing a release date of 17 May in Australia, 20 May in the United Kingdom, and 21 May in the United States. It later appeared as an Amazon.com pre-order on CD, vinyl and directly from the Random Access Memories official website. The album became available for preview streaming via the iTunes Store on 13 May 2013. It was also released for streaming on Spotify, with the lead single, "Get Lucky", topping Spotify's first digital streaming chart in the process.

On 22 February 2023, it was announced that Random Access Memories'' would be reissued in a 10th anniversary edition on 12 May. It will include 35 minutes of bonus content including the first international pressing of "Horizon", unreleased demos and outtakes, and the edit of "Touch" used in the video announcing the duo's disbandment. A Dolby Atmos version of the album will also be released the same day.

References

External links 
 
 

2013 albums
Daft Punk albums
Albums produced by Guy-Manuel de Homem-Christo
Albums produced by Thomas Bangalter
Albums recorded at Electric Lady Studios
Albums recorded at A&M Studios
Albums recorded at Capitol Studios
Columbia Records albums
Grammy Award for Album of the Year
Grammy Award for Best Dance/Electronica Album
Grammy Award for Best Engineered Album, Non-Classical